Ivans Bugajenkovs (born 18 February 1938 in Kumylzhensky District, Volgograd Oblast) is a Latvian former volleyball player who competed for the Soviet Union in the 1964 Summer Olympics and in the 1968 Summer Olympics.

He was born in Burlatskiy, Volgograd Oblast.

Career
In 1964 he was part of the Soviet team which won the gold medal in the Olympic tournament. He played all nine matches. Four years later he won his second gold medal with the Soviet team in the 1968 Olympic tournament. He played eight matches.

Bugajenkovs worked in Iran for over 16 years, as the general manager of all age groups of Iranian volleyball, from 1991 to 2007.

References

External links
 profile

1938 births
Living people
People from Volgograd Oblast
Russian men's volleyball players
Latvian men's volleyball players
Soviet men's volleyball players
Olympic volleyball players of the Soviet Union
Volleyball players at the 1964 Summer Olympics
Volleyball players at the 1968 Summer Olympics
Olympic gold medalists for the Soviet Union
Olympic medalists in volleyball
Medalists at the 1968 Summer Olympics
Medalists at the 1964 Summer Olympics
Sportspeople from Volgograd Oblast